The 1996–97 USISL I-League was an American soccer season run by the United Systems of Independent Soccer Leagues during the winter of 1996 to 1997.

Regular season

East Division

West Division

Limited schedule teams

Final

MVP:

Honors
 Most Valuable Player:  Billy Ronson
 Top Point Scorer:  Billy Ronson (70)
 Top Scorer: Brian Adams (23)
 Top Goalkeeper:  Dave Tenney
 Rookie of the Year:  Jessie Williams
 Coach of the Year:  Kevin Healey

External links
The Year in American Soccer - 1997
United Soccer Leagues Statistical History, Part 3 (1997-1999))

USISL indoor seasons
Uni
Uni